Heike Nagel (née Hustede, born 16 January 1946) is a German former swimmer who competed in the 1964, 1968 and 1972 Summer Olympics. She won a bronze medal in the 4 × 100 m medley relay in 1968, and three times reached the finals in individual butterfly events in 1964 and 1968. She also won two medals at the European championships in 1966 and 1970.

References

1946 births
Living people
German female swimmers
Female butterfly swimmers
Olympic swimmers of the United Team of Germany
Olympic swimmers of West Germany
Swimmers at the 1964 Summer Olympics
Swimmers at the 1968 Summer Olympics
Swimmers at the 1972 Summer Olympics
Olympic bronze medalists for West Germany
Olympic bronze medalists in swimming
Sportspeople from Osnabrück
European Aquatics Championships medalists in swimming
Medalists at the 1968 Summer Olympics
20th-century German women
21st-century German women